They Nest (also known as Creepy Crawlers) is a 2000 American science fiction horror film directed by Ellory Elkayem and starring Thomas Calabro, Dean Stockwell, John Savage, and Kristen Dalton.

Plot
Stressed by marital breakdown and alcohol problems, Dr. Ben Cahill freezes up under pressure in the emergency room. He is forced into taking a break by his superior and decides to unwind for a few months in the house he and his ex bought on Orr island, a fishing community off the coast of Maine.

Here he starts examining, at the request of Sheriff Hobbs, some animal and human corpses with strange internal as well as external injuries.

The doctor observes that one of the red cockroaches which recently infested the island has pincers, which is most unusual. He reads up and contacts the university entomology department, where this African species is considered obscure. He finds that his house is also infested with these cockroaches.

Cahill is on the receiving end of local backlash and one man Jack, breaks into and attempts to trash his home but is killed by the cockroaches.

The sherrif allows Cahill to perform an autopsy upon Jack and he discovers that these cockroach-like insects burrow into people and nest inside them liquidating the internal organs before bursting out of the host. At first, some of townspeople begin to suspect that Cahill was responsible for the deaths of their friends, resulting in a mob attacking Cahill and locking him and his girlfriend Nell in jail. Meanwhile Sherrif Hobbs is attacked by Jack's brother Eamon when he attempts to stop them breaking into Cahill's home, he is locked in the basement and killed by the insects and his body is found after one local, Guy attempts to free him.

When released from jail Cahill and Nell immediately begin to evacuate the locals beginning with Nell's mother and the children in her school class although one pupil is missing and Cahill and Nell rescue him after finding his parents dead and discovering the cockroaches are nesting in a barn. They then flee back into town.

After warning the reluctant locals of the danger a swarm of the mutant insects fly overhead. Now believing Cahill's story they attempt to flee but many perish including Eamon and his goons. Cahill, Nell, Guy and Henry get in a boat and try to reach the mainland, but are again attacked but they overturn the boat and set a fuel pump alight incinerating the bugs just as the military is called in to deal with the problem. However, it is revealed that one of the bugs had made it to the mainland, ending the film ambiguously.

Production
Based on this work, director Elkayem got to direct Eight Legged Freaks. The movie features Kristin Dalton in one of her first roles. She found the Canadian location shoot fun albeit a bit long and stated this was where she caught the acting bug.

Reception

the Science Fiction and Horror review gave the movie two and a half stars, finding nothing new in the movie but that the effects are very good and character building were a plus. TV Guide also found the movie formulistic, but also praised the directing. Similarly, Variety liked the effects but found the movie to lack originality.

References

External links

2000 films
2000 horror films
2000 science fiction films
2000s science fiction horror films
American science fiction horror films
Films about insects
Films about physicians
Films directed by Ellory Elkayem
Films set in Maine
American natural horror films
2000 directorial debut films
The Kushner-Locke Company films
2000s English-language films
2000s American films